This is a list of players, both past and present, who appeared in at least one game for the New York Giants or the San Francisco Giants.

Players in bold are members of the National Baseball Hall of Fame.

Players in italics have had their numbers retired by the team.


A

David Aardsma
Fernando Abad
Woody Abernathy
Tony Abreu
Jeremy Accardo
Cristhian Adames
Ace Adams
Glenn Adams
Ricky Adams
Ehíré Adríanza
Jeremy Affeldt
Eddie Ainsmith
Kurt Ainsworth
Mike Aldrete
Vic Aldridge
Doyle Alexander
Gary Alexander
Scott Alexander
Edgardo Alfonzo
Eliézer Alfonzo
Andy Allanson
Ethan Allen
Johnny Allen
Myron Allen
Felipe Alou
Jesús Alou
Matty Alou
Moisés Alou
Aaron Altherr
José Álvarez
Wilson Álvarez
Joey Amalfitano
Red Ames
Dave Anderson
Fred Anderson
Shaun Anderson
Tyler Anderson
Hub Andrews
Nate Andrews
Rob Andrews
Johnny Antonelli
Nori Aoki
Luis Aquino
Jack Aragon
Joaquín Árias
Chris Arnold
Morrie Arnovich
René Arocha
Christian Arroyo
Scott Atchison
Rich Aurilia
Tyler Austin
Abiatal Avelino
Manny Aybar
Bill Ayers

B

Charlie Babb
Charlie Babington
Lore Bader
Cory Bailey
Ed Bailey
Mark Bailey
Loren Bain
Al Baird
Doug Baird
Dusty Baker
Howard Baker
Tom Baker
Harry Baldwin
Mark Baldwin
Jeff Ball
George Bamberger
Dave Bancroft
Tom Bannon
Caleb Baragar
Steve Barber
Curt Barclay
Babe Barna
Jesse Barnes
Virgil Barnes
Bob Barr
Jim Barr
Kyle Barraclough
Jose Barrios
Shad Barry
Joey Bart
Dick Bartell
Bill Bartley
Bob Barthelson
Bob Barton
Shawn Barton
Luis Alexander Basabe
Kevin Bass
Charley Bassett
Bill Bathe
Kim Batiste
Larry Battam
Denny Bautista
José Bautista
Joe Bean
Desmond Beatty
Buck Becannon
Rod Beck
Beals Becker
Marty Becker
Gordon Beckham
Jake Beckley
Steve Bedrosian
Roy Beecher
Tyler Beede
Chris Begg
Joe Beggs
Ed Begley
Gene Begley
Hank Behrman
David Bell
Hi Bell
Brandon Belt
Carlos Beltrán
Marvin Benard
Armando Benítez
Mike Benjamin
Jack Bentley
Larry Benton
Rube Benton
Todd Benzinger
Juan Berenguer
Travis Bergen
Wally Berger
Dave Bergman
Jack Berly
Curt Bernard
Ray Berres
Joe Berry
Damon Berryhill
Dick Bertell
Bob Bescher
Ty Blach
Bud Black
Ray Black
Travis Blackley
Rae Blaemire
Dámaso Blanco
Gregor Blanco
Don Blasingame
Buddy Blattner
Marv Blaylock
Bob Blewett
Vida Blue
Clint Blume
John Boccabella
Brett Bochy
Randy Bockus
Brian Bocock
Brian Boehringer
Carl Boles
Bobby Bolin
Skye Bolt
Barry Bonds
Bobby Bonds
Henry Boney
Zeke Bonura
Greg Booker
Ike Boone
Pedro Borbón
Bill Bordley
Andy Boswell
Kent Bottenfield
Steve Bourgeois
Chris Bourjos
Chick Bowen
Cy Bowen
Frank Bowerman
John Bowker
Bob Bowman
Ernie Bowman
Joe Bowman
Roger Bowman
Jack Boyle
Jimmy Boyle
Vic Bradford
Tom Bradley
Dave Brain
Fred Brainard
Jackie Brandt
Jeff Brantley
Rob Brantly
John Brebbia
Fred Breining
Bob Brenly
Don Brennan
Roger Bresnahan
Eddie Bressoud
Jack Brewer
Jamie Brewington
Al Bridwell
Brad Brink
Lewis Brinson
Mike Broadway
Chris Brock
Steve Brodie
Troy Brohawn
Ken Brondell
Terry Bross
Dan Brouthers
Jim Brower
Chris Brown
Eddie Brown
Gary Brown
Jake Brown
Jim Brown
Jumbo Brown
Ollie Brown
Trevor Brown
William Brown
George Browne
Greg Brummett
Kris Bryant
Ron Bryant
Garland Buckeye
Dick Buckley
Mike Budnick
Charlie Buelow
Madison Bumgarner
Dave Burba
Bob Burda
Enrique Burgos
Eddie Burke
Frank Burke
John Burke
Jesse Burkett
John Burkett
Ellis Burks
George Burns
Oyster Burns
Pete Burnside
Buster Burrell
Pat Burrell
Emmanuel Burriss
Bullet Joe Bush
Brett Butler
Frank Butler
Bud Byerly
Marlon Byrd

C

Enos Cabell
Melky Cabrera
Orlando Cabrera
Leon Cadore
Trevor Cahill
Matt Cain
Sam Calderone
Mike Caldwell
Willie Calhoun
Orlando Calixte
Jim Callahan
Mark Calvert
Ernie Camacho
Sal Campfield
Jay Canizaro
Ben Cantwell
John Carden
José Cardenal
Roger Carey
Dan Carlson
Steve Carlton
Bob Carpenter
Mark Carreon
Bill Carrick
Don Carrithers
Kid Carsey
Blackie Carter
Gary Carter
Joe Carter
Larry Carter
Curt Casali
Ed Caskin
Santiago Casilla
Alberto Castillo
José Castillo
Foster Castleman
Slick Castleman
Kervin Castro
Red Causey
Orlando Cepeda
Leon Chagnon
Tiny Chaplin
Hal Chase
Ken Chase
Tyler Chatwood
Ángel Chávez
Néstor Chávez
Virgil Cheeves
Lou Chiozza
Don Choate
Mike Chris
Justin Christian
Jason Christiansen
Vinnie Chulk
Bill Cissell
John Clapp
Doug Clark
Jack Clark
Roy Clark
Watty Clark
Will Clark
Willie Clark
Artie Clarke
Boileryard Clarke
Dad Clarke
Bill Clarkson
Dad Clarkson
Royce Clayton
Elmer Cleveland
Ty Cline
Gil Coan
Alex Cobb
Dick Coffman
Dick Cogan
Andy Cohen
Jimmie Coker
Craig Colbert
Tom Colcolough
Joe Coleman
Darnell Coles
Tyler Colvin
Pete Compton
Keith Comstock
Frank Connaughton
Joe Connell
Bill Connelly
Joe Connolly
Roger Connor
Jim Constable
Sandy Consuegra
Jack Conway
Dennis Cook
Bobby Coombs
Jimmy Cooney
Sam Coonrod
Brian Cooper
Claude Cooper
Mort Cooper
Walker Cooper
Larry Corcoran
Tommy Corcoran
Erik Cordier
Jeff Cornell
Terry Cornutt
Kevin Correia
Al Corwin
Pete Cote
Jharel Cotton
Roscoe Coughlin
Dick Cramer
Del Crandall
Doc Crandall
Ed Crane
Sam Crane
Brandon Crawford
Pat Crawford
Doug Creek
Pete Cregan
Felipe Crespo
Kyle Crick
Hughie Critz
Ray Crone
Jack Cronin
Buddy Crump
Deivi Cruz
Héctor Cruz
Jacob Cruz
José Cruz Jr.
Al Cuccinello
Tony Cuccinello
Johnny Cueto
Charlie Culberson
Dick Culler
John Cumberland
Bill Cunningham
Harry Curtis
John Curtis
Mike Cvengros

D

John D'Acquisto
Bill Dahlen
Ed Daily
Brian Dallimore
George Daly
Harry Danning
Alvin Dark
Chase d'Arnaud
Danny Darwin
Claude Davenport
Jim Davenport
Chick Davies
George Davies
Chili Davis
Eric Davis
George Davis
Harry Davis
Ira Davis
J. D. Davis
Jaylin Davis
Jim Davis
John Davis
Kiddo Davis
Mark Davis
Rajai Davis
Red Davis
Ron Davis
Russ Davis
Mike Davison
Tomás de la Rosa
Austin Dean
Paul Dean
Wayland Dean
Pat Deasley
Alejandro De Aza
Steve Decker
Dummy Deegan
Rob Deer
Iván DeJesús
Bill Dekoning
Miguel del Toro
Jim Delahanty
Wilson Delgado
Rich DeLucia
Al Demaree
Frank Demaree
Mark Dempsey
Travis Denker
Jerry Denny
Roger Denzer
Mark DeRosa
Anthony DeSclafani
Jim Deshaies
Mickey Devine
Art Devlin
Jim Devlin
Josh Devore
Al DeVormer
Mark Dewey
Alex Diaz
Alex Dickerson
Johnny Dickshot
Walt Dickson
Chuck Diering
Dick Dietz
Vince DiMaggio
Ed Doheny
Cozy Dolan
Chris Dominguez
Red Donahue
Mike Donlin
Jim Donnelly
Pete Donohue
Red Dooin
Mickey Doolan
Mike Dorgan
Phil Douglas
Camilo Doval
Kelly Downs
Matt Downs
Jack Doyle
Larry Doyle
Dave Dravecky
Clem Dreisewerd
Chuck Dressen
Rob Dressler
Dan Driessen
Louis Drucke
Mauricio Dubón
Jean Dubuc
Jim Duffalo
Frank Duffy
Matt Duffy
Steven Duggar
Jack Dunn
Andy Dunning
Jake Dunning
Shawon Dunston
Bull Durham
Ray Durham
Adam Duvall
Jim Dwyer
Ben Dyer
Sam Dyson

E

Hugh East
Steve Edlefsen
Bob Elliott
Claude Elliott
Randy Elliott
Jason Ellison
Alan Embree
Slim Emmerich
Charlie English
Gil English
Eric Erickson
Paul Erickson
Ángel Escobar
Geno Espineli
Bobby Estalella
Dick Estelle
Dude Esterbrook
Shawn Estes
Thairo Estrada
Leo Estrella
Bobby Etheridge
Darrell Evans
Roy Evans
Steve Evans
Hoot Evers
Joe Evers
Buck Ewing
John Ewing
Scott Eyre

F

Stuart Fairchild
Pete Falcone
Rikkert Faneyte
Paul Faries
Bob Farley
Doc Farrell
Duke Farrell
Jeff Fassero
Bill Faul
Jim Faulkner
Charlie Faust
Tim Federowicz
Mike Felder
Harry Feldman
Harry Felix
Pedro Feliz
George Ferguson
Osvaldo Fernández
Jocko Fields
Luis Figueroa
Steve Filipowicz
Jim Finigan
Bill Finley
Steve Finley
Rube Fischer
Leo Fishel
Chauncey Fisher
Don Fisher
Eddie Fisher
Jack Fisher
John Fitzgerald
Matty Fitzgerald
Freddie Fitzsimmons
Tom Fleming
Art Fletcher
Paul Florence
Wilmer Flores
Carney Flynn
Ray Foley
Tim Foli
Mike Fontenot
Jesse Foppert
Darren Ford
Mike Ford
Frank Foreman
Elmer Foster
George Foster
Pop Foster
Reddy Foster
Keith Foulke
Alan Fowlkes
Charlie Fox
Enderson Franco
Jeff Francoeur
Kevin Frandsen
Wayne Franklin
Herman Franks
Lonny Frey
Steve Frey
Charlie Frisbee
Frankie Frisch
Art Fromme
Tito Fuentes
Shorty Fuller
Chick Fullis
Aaron Fultz

G

Frank Gabler
Len Gabrielson
Augie Galan
Andrés Galarraga
Rich Gale
Al Gallagher
John Ganzel
Joe Garagiola
Aramis Garcia
Jarlin García
Rico Garcia
Al Gardella
Danny Gardella
Art Gardner
Billy Gardner
Mark Gardner
Bob Garibaldi
Ryan Garko
Phil Garner
Willie Garoni
Scott Garrelts
Gil Garrido
Alex Gaston
Chad Gaudin
Kevin Gausman
Gary Gearhart
Dinty Gearin
Cory Gearrin
Johnny Gee
Joe Genewich
Scooter Gennett
Harvey Gentry
Bill George
Oscar Georgy
Mike Gerber
Joe Gerhardt
Les German
Al Gettel
Charlie Gettig
George Gibson
Joe Gibbon
Russ Gibson
Sam Gibson
Paul Giel
Dan Giese
Billy Gilbert
Jack Gilbert
Tookie Gilbert
Cole Gillespie
Conor Gillaspie
Pete Gillespie
Jim Gladd
Dan Gladden
Jack Glasscock
Kid Gleason
Ed Glenn
Al Glossop
Wayne Gomes
Miguel Gómez
Pat Gomez
Randy Gomez
Roberto Gómez
Rubén Gómez
Luis González
Mike González
Ed Goodson
Tom Goodwin
Sid Gordon
George Gore
Tom Gorman
Rich Gossage
Jim Gott
Trevor Gott
Ted Goulait
Hank Gowdy
Mike Grady
Jack Graham
Moonlight Graham
Eddie Grant
Mark Grant
George Grantham
Mickey Grasso
David Green
Grant Green
Zach Green
Todd Greene
Kent Greenfield
Kenny Greer
Hal Gregg
Pug Griffin
Sandy Griffin
Tom Griffin
Burleigh Grimes
Roy Grimes
Marquis Grissom
Marv Grissom
Dick Groat
Heinie Groh
Tom Grubbs
José Guillén
Brad Gulden
Harry Gumbert
Eric Gunderson
Jandel Gustave
César Gutiérrez
Juan Gutiérrez
Edwards Guzman
Jesús Guzmán

H

Yamid Haad
Bert Haas
Eric Hacker
Bump Hadley
Bill Haeffner
Tom Hafey
Odell Hale
Ed Halicki
Bill Hall
Bob Hall
Cody Hall
Mel Hall
Tom Haller
Jack Hallett
Jim Hamby
Darryl Hamilton
Steve Hamilton
Atlee Hammaker
Jeffrey Hammonds
Bill Hands
Frank Hankinson
Jack Hannifin
Andy Hansen
Alen Hanson
Scott Hardesty
Red Hardy
Alan Hargesheimer
George Harper
John Harrell
Ray Harrell
Gail Harris
Vic Harris
Jack Harshman
Jim Ray Hart
Dean Hartgraves
Chick Hartley
Grover Hartley
Fred Hartman
Gabby Hartnett
Clint Hartung
Mickey Haslin
Gil Hatfield
George Hausmann
LaTroy Hawkins
Pink Hawley
Charlie Hayes
Ray Hayworth
Fran Healy
Francis Healy
Bunn Hearn
Jim Hearn
Dave Heaverlo
Jim Hegan
Bud Heine
Tyler Heineman
Tom Heintzelman
Bob Heise
Heath Hembree
Ed Hemingway
Dave Henderson
Ken Henderson
Bob Hendley
Ed Hendricks
Jack Hendricks
Butch Henline
Brad Hennessey
Bill Henry
Doug Henry
Dutch Henry
John Henry
Chuck Hensley
Clay Hensley
Ron Herbel
Fred Herbert
Gil Heredia
Matt Herges
Dustin Hermanson
Gorkys Hernández
Liván Hernández
Roberto Hernández
Larry Herndon
Tom Herr
Orel Hershiser
Buck Herzog
Larry Hesterfer
Chris Heston
Joe Heving
Jack Hiatt
Bryan Hickerson
Charlie Hickman
Brandon Hicks
Kirby Higbe
Mahlon Higbee
Aaron Hill
Carmen Hill
Glenallen Hill
Marc Hill
Shea Hillenbrand
Chuck Hiller
Frank Hiller
Alex Hinshaw
Sean Hjelle
Billy Hoeft
Bobby Hofman
Shanty Hogan
Walter Holke
Al Holland
Derek Holland
Mul Holland
Steve Holm
Ducky Holmes
Chris Hook
Rogers Hornsby
Joe Hornung
Brian Horwitz
Steve Hosey
Jim Howarth
Shorty Howe
Bill Howerton
Bob Howry
Waite Hoyt
Trenidad Hubbard
Bill Hubbell
Carl Hubbell
Willis Hudlin
Johnny Hudson
Tim Hudson
Al Huenke
Aubrey Huff
David Huff
John Humphries
Nick Hundley
Randy Hundley
Bill Hunnefield
Ron Hunt
Herb Hunter
Walt Huntzinger
Jae-gyun Hwang

I

Hooks Iott
Monte Irvin
Travis Ishikawa
Mike Ivie

J

Ray Jablonski
Austin Jackson
Jay Jackson
Jim Jackson
Mike Jackson
Travis Jackson
Merwin Jacobson
Art Jahn
Bernie James
Chris James
Skip James
Larry Jansen
Stan Javier
Tex Jeanes
Mike Jeffcoat
Marcus Jensen
Ryan Jensen
Williams Jerez
Dany Jiménez
Waldis Joaquín
Connor Joe
Art Johnson
Brian Johnson
Bryce Johnson
Don Johnson
Elmer Johnson
Erik Johnson
Frank Johnson
Fred Johnson
Jerry Johnson
Jim Johnson
Pierce Johnson
Randy Johnson
Wallace Johnson
Youngy Johnson
Greg Johnston
Jimmy Johnston
John Johnstone
Roy Joiner
Bumpus Jones
Chris Jones (1980s outfielder)
Chris Jones (1990s outfielder)
Dax Jones
Gordon Jones
Jim Jones
Johnny Jones
Ryder Jones
Sam Jones
Sheldon Jones
Sherman Jones
Tracy Jones
Claude Jonnard
Buck Jordan
Spider Jorgensen
Corban Joseph
Von Joshua
Bill Joyce
Bob Joyce
Ralph Judd
Jeff Juden
Jakob Junis
Ed Jurak
Billy Jurges

K

Alex Kampouris
Ray Katt
Benny Kauff
Tony Kaufmann
Scott Kazmir
Bob Kearney
Tim Keefe
Willie Keeler
Duke Kelleher
Casey Kelly
George Kelly
King Kelly
Brickyard Kennedy
Monte Kennedy
Terry Kennedy
Jeff Kent
Jeff Keppinger
Buddy Kerr
Mike Kickham
Roger Kieschnick
Pete Kilduff
Red Killefer
Jim King
Lee King
Silver King
Mike Kingery
Brian Kingman
Dave Kingman
Matt Kinney
Bob Kinsella
La Rue Kirby
Jay Kirke
Willie Kirkland
Al Klawitter
Ryan Klesko
Ron Kline
Steve Kline
Joe Klinger
Clyde Kluttz
Andrew Knapp
Frank Knauss
Bob Knepper
Justin Knoedler
Jimmy Knowles
Brad Kocher
Pip Koehler
Len Koenecke
Mark Koenig
Brad Komminsk
Alex Konikowski
George Kontos
Wally Kopf
Dave Koslo
Jack Kramer
Erik Kratz
Jack Kraus
Red Kress
Jason Krizan
Ernie Krueger
Mike Krukow
Harvey Kuenn
Duane Kuiper
Randy Kutcher

L

Bob Lacey
Mike LaCoss
Joe Lafata
Mike Laga
Dick Lajeskie
Tom Lampkin
Rick Lancellotti
Hobie Landrith
Don Landrum
Hal Lanier
Max Lanier
Dave LaPoint
Norm Larker
Pat Larkin
Don Larsen
Bill Laskey
Tommy La Stella
Arlie Latham
Tacks Latimer
Billy Lauder
Gary Lavelle
Derek Law
Garland Lawing
Tim Layana
Les Layton
Tony Lazzeri
Freddy Leach
Jalal Leach
Rick Leach
Mike Leake
Fred Lear
Ricky Ledée
Roy Lee
Thornton Lee
Al Lefevre
Craig Lefferts
Hank Leiber
Mark Leiter
Dummy Leitner
Johnnie LeMaster
Dick LeMay
Bob Lennon
Jeffrey Leonard
Mark Leonard
Dominic Leone
Randy Lerch
Sam Leslie
Al Levine
Darren Lewis
Fred Lewis
Mark Lewis
Don Liddle
Tim Lincecum
Todd Linden
Freddie Lindstrom
Scott Linebrink
Frank Linzy
Zack Littell
Dick Littlefield
Dennis Littlejohn
Greg Litton
Mickey Livingston
Jake Livingstone
Mauricio Llovera
Hans Lobert
Whitey Lockman
Billy Loes
Kenny Lofton
Jack Lohrke
Bill Lohrman
Ryan Lollis
Ernie Lombardi
Lou Lombardo
Dale Long
Sammy Long
Evan Longoria
Javier López
Bill Loughran
Shane Loux
Terrell Lowery
Noah Lowry
Hal Luby
Red Lucas
Ray Lucas
Trey Lunsford
Dolf Luque
Mike Lynch
Red Lynn
Denny Lyons
Harry Lyons

M

Malcolm MacDonald
Dixon Machado
Jean Machi
Ken MacKenzie
Waddy Macphee
Garry Maddox
Ed Madjeski
Bill Madlock
Bill Magee
Sal Maglie
Freddie Maguire
Jack Maguire
Jim Mahady
Bill Malarkey
Joe Malay
Candy Maldonado
Jim Mallory
Gus Mancuso
Jim Mangan
Leo Mangum
Charlie Manlove
Les Mann
Kirt Manwaring
Georges Maranda
Firpo Marberry
Joe Margoneri
Juan Marichal
Rube Marquard
Chris Marrero
Dave Marshall
Doc Marshall (C)
Doc Marshall (IF)
Jim Marshall
Willard Marshall
Yunior Marte
Frank Martin
Jerry Martin
Joe Martin
Renie Martin
Dave Martinez
Joe Martinez
Ramón Martínez (IF)
Don Mason
Roger Mason
Mike Matheny
Christy Mathewson
Osiris Matos
Henry Mathewson
Gary Matthews
Mike Mattimore
Al Maul
Ernie Maun
Bert Maxwell
Justin Maxwell
Milt May
Buster Maynard
Brent Mayne
Eddie Mayo
Carl Mays
Willie Mays
Vin Mazzaro
Algie McBride
Windy McCall
Randy McCament
Roger McCardell
Joe McCarthy
Johnny McCarthy
David McCarty
Lew McCarty
Scott McClain
Paul McClellan
Mike McCormick (OF)
Mike McCormick (P)
Moose McCormick
Willie McCovey
Tom McCreery
Andrew McCutchen
Lindy McDaniel
Sam McDowell
Andy McGaffigan
Dan McGann
Bill McGee
Jake McGee
Willie McGee
Casey McGehee
Joe McGinnity
Lynn McGlothen
Mickey McGowan
John McGraw
Bill McKechnie
Alex McKinnon
Art McLarney
Larry McLean
Don McMahon
Jack McMahon
George McMillan
Hugh McMullen
Jim McNamara
Tim McNamara
Frank McPartlin
Hugh McQuillan
Charlie Mead
Brandon Medders
Joe Medwick
Jouett Meekin
Mark Melancon
Francisco Meléndez
Juan Melo
Cliff Melton
Bob Melvin
Jock Menefee
Tony Menendez
Conner Menez
Luis Mercedes
Yermín Mercedes
Win Mercer
Fred Merkle
John Merritt
Sam Mertes
José Mesa
Randy Messenger
Butch Metzger
Roger Metzger
Irish Meusel
Chief Meyers
Jim Middleton
José Mijares
Bruce Miller
Jim Miller
Justin Miller
Roscoe Miller
Shelby Miller
Stu Miller
Whitey Miller
Billy Milligan
Jocko Milligan
Willie Mills
Pete Milne
Eddie Milner
Damon Minor
Greg Minton
Steve Mintz
Gino Minutelli
Doug Mirabelli
Pat Misch
Clarence Mitchell
Kevin Mitchell
Johnny Mize
Randy Moffitt
Dustan Mohr
Bengie Molina
Bill Monbouquette
Carlos Moncrief
Johnny Monell
John Monroe
Willie Montañez
John Montefusco
Rich Monteleone
Ramon Monzant
Jim Mooney
Al Moore
Bobby Moore
Eddie Moore
Euel Moore
Jo-Jo Moore
Matt Moore
Joe Morgan
Alvin Morman
Reyes Moronta
Bill Morrell
Bryan Morris
John Morris
Matt Morris
Michael Morse
Guillermo Moscoso
Damian Moss
Howie Moss
Guillermo Mota
Manny Mota
Bill Mueller
Don Mueller
Heinie Mueller
Ray Mueller
Billy Muffett
Terry Mulholland
Fran Mullins
Van Mungo
Scott Munter
Masanori Murakami
Bobby Murcer
Bob Murphy
Danny Murphy (C)
Danny Murphy (IF)
Frank Murphy
Pat Murphy
Yale Murphy
Calvin Murray
Red Murray
Rich Murray
George Myatt
Glenn Myatt

N

Xavier Nady
Philip Nastu
Joe Nathan
Offa Neal
Tom Needham
Art Nehf
Candy Nelson
Ray Nelson
Robb Nen
Charlie Newman
Bobo Newsom
Chet Nichols, Sr.
Roy Nichols
Steve Nicosia
Bert Niehoff
Lance Niekro
Bob Nieman
Donell Nixon
Ray Noble
Matt Nokes
Nick Noonan
Billy North
Rafael Novoa
Eduardo Núñez

O

Ken Oberkfell
Tom O'Brien
Ivan Ochoa
Walter Ockey
Danny O'Connell
Jimmy O'Connell
Hank O'Day
Ken O'Dea
Billy O'Dell
Lefty O'Doul
Joe Oeschger
Bob O'Farrell
Jack Ogden
Hal O'Hagan
Bill O'Hara
Steven Okert
Al Oliver
Nate Oliver
Francisco Oliveras
Tom O'Malley
Randy O'Neal
Mickey O'Neil
John O'Neill
Tip O'Neill
Jack Onslow
Steve Ontiveros (IF)
Joe Orengo
Jim O'Rourke
Tom O'Rourke
Dave Orr
John Orsino
Luis Ortiz
Russ Ortiz
Dan Ortmeier
Josh Osich
Dan Otero
Marty O'Toole
Mel Ott
Phil Ouellette
Henry Oxley

P

Kevin Padlo
Ángel Pagán
José Pagán
Matt Palmer
Emilio Palmero
Joe Panik
Michael Papierski
Jarrett Parker
Rick Parker
Roy Parmelee
Gerardo Parra
Bronswell Patrick
John Patterson
Pat Patterson
Gene Paulette
Jake Peavy
Joc Pederson
Homer Peel
Francisco Peguero
Dan Peltier
Jim Pena
Ramiro Pena
Hunter Pence
Brad Penny
Wandy Peralta
Juan Pérez
Marty Perez
Neifi Pérez
Tony Perezchica
Jon Perlman
Pol Perritt
Gaylord Perry
Cap Peterson
Yusmeiro Petit
Joe Pettini
Charlie Petty
Fred Pfeffer
Monte Pfyl
Dave Philley
Dick Phillips
Jack Phillips
J. R. Phillips
Mike Phillips
Bill Phyle
Mario Picone
Billy Pierce
Gracie Pierce
A. J. Pierzynski
Sandy Piez
Joe Pignatano
Jess Pike
Brett Pill
Kevin Pillar
Skip Pitlock
Joe Pittman
Emil Planeta
Ed Plank
Norman Plitt
Ray Poat
Joe Poetz
Hugh Poland
Lou Polli
Drew Pomeranz
Sidney Ponson
Jim Poole
Ned Porter
Mark Portugal
Buster Posey
Brian Powell
Dante Powell
Les Powers
John Pregenzer
Joe Price (OF)
Joe Price (P)
Bob Priddy
Ford Proctor
Hub Pruett
Ron Pruitt
Miguel Puente
Brandon Puffer
John Puhl
Ewald Pyle

Q

Luis Quiñones
José Quintana
Guillermo Quiróz
Dan Quisenberry

R

John Rabb
Dave Rader
Pat Ragan
John Rainey
Gary Rajsich
Julio Ramírez
Neil Ramirez
Ramón Ramírez
Heliot Ramos
Cody Ransom
Jeff Ransom
Earl Rapp
Goldie Rapp
Pat Rapp
Bill Rariden
Johnny Rawlings
Chris Ray
Bugs Raymond
Frank Reberger
Glenn Redmon
Jeff Reed
Michael Reed
Steve Reed
Andy Reese
Joe Regan
Jessie Reid
Bill Reidy
Ken Reitz
Mike Remlinger
Marshall Renfroe
Édgar Rentería
Rick Reuschel
Nap Reyes
Matt Reynolds
Bobby Rhawn
Dusty Rhodes
Frank Riccelli
Gene Richards
Paul Richards
Danny Richardson
Hardy Richardson
Joey Rickard
Steve Ridzik
Dave Righetti
Bill Rigney
Ernest Riles
George Riley
Jimmy Ring
Armando Ríos
Allen Ripley
Jimmy Ripple
Hank Ritter
Rubén Rivera
Joe Roa
John Roach
Dave Roberts (OF)
Dave Roberts (P)
Daniel Robertson
Dave Robertson
Rich Robertson
Craig Robinson
Don Robinson
Jack Robinson
Jeff Robinson
Andre Rodgers
Eric Rodin
Carlos Rodón
Dereck Rodríguez
Félix Rodríguez
Guillermo Rodríguez
José Rodríguez
Rich Rodriguez
Rick Rodriguez
Ron Roenicke
Wally Roettger
Kevin Rogers
Tyler Rogers
Ryan Rohlinger
Sergio Romo
John Roper
Jimmy Rosario
Sandy Rosario
Don Rose
Goody Rosen
Harry Rosenberg
Cody Ross
George Ross
Joe Rosselli
Frank Rosso
Edd Roush
Aaron Rowand
Mike Rowland
Johnny Rucker
Dick Rudolph
Ken Rudolph
Kirk Rueter
Darin Ruf
Rudy Rufer
Justin Ruggiano
Dan Runzler
Amos Rusie
Blondy Ryan
Connie Ryan
Rosy Ryan

S

Ray Sadecki
Mike Sadek
Billy Sadler
Ryan Sadowski
Slim Sallee
Jack Salveson
Manny Salvo
Jeff Samardzija
Ron Samford
Roger Samuels
Aaron Sanchez
Alejandro Sánchez
Alex Sánchez
Freddy Sanchez
Héctor Sánchez
Jonathan Sánchez
Rey Sánchez
Deion Sanders
Reggie Sanders
Scott Sanderson
Pablo Sandoval
Jack Sanford
Andrés Santana
F. P. Santangelo
Benito Santiago
Chad Santos
Francisco Santos
Gregory Santos
Bill Sarni
Mackey Sasser
Hank Sauer
Bill Sayles
Skeeter Scalzi
Mort Scanlan
Steve Scarsone
Ray Schalk
Bobby Schang
Dan Schatzeder
Rube Schauer
Mike Schemer
Hank Schenz
Nate Schierholtz
Admiral Schlei
Bob Schmidt
Jason Schmidt
Crazy Schmit
Red Schoendienst
Ducky Schofield
Hank Schreiber
Pop Schriver
Bob Schroder
Hal Schumacher
Ferdie Schupp
Marco Scutaro
Jack Scott
Tim Scott
Doc Sechrist
Bob Seeds
José Segura
Kip Selbach
Sam Selman
Scott Servais
Scott Service
Frank Seward
Cy Seymour
Adam Shabala
Tillie Shafer
Spike Shannon
Jack Sharrott
Bob Shaw
Chris Shaw
Danny Shay
Red Shea
Jim Sheehan
Tommy Sheehan
Jimmie Sherfy
Pat Sheridan
Tsuyoshi Shinjo
Ralph Shinners
Joe Shipley
Ernie Shore
Bill Shores
Ed Sicking
Norm Siebern
Seth Sigsby
Dan Slania
Austin Slater
Mike Slattery
Scottie Slayback
Bruce Sloan
Al Smith (LHP)
Al Smith (RHP)
Aleck Smith
Billy Smith
Burch Smith
Chris Smith
Earl Smith
George Smith
Harry Smith
Heinie Smith
Jimmy Smith
Mike Smith (1890s OF)
Mike Smith (1920s OF)
Red Smith
Reggie Smith
Will Smith
Justin Smoak
Drew Smyly
D. J. Snelten
Duke Snider
Fred Snodgrass
Colonel Snover
J. T. Snow
Cory Snyder
Frank Snyder
Steve Soderstrom
Donovan Solano
Yangervis Solarte
Mose Solomon
Andy Sommers
Don Songer
Lary Sorensen
Billy Sorrell
Elías Sosa
Billy Southworth
Warren Spahn
Denard Span
Tully Sparks
Bob Speake
Horace Speed
Chris Speier
Daryl Spencer
George Spencer
Glenn Spencer
Roy Spencer
Vern Spencer
Harry Spilman
Al Spohrer
Jerry Spradlin
Ebba St. Claire
General Stafford
Heinie Stafford
Al Stanek
Eddie Stanky
Mike Stanton
Ray Starr
Jigger Statz
Bob Steele
Jim Steels
Jeff Stember
Casey Stengel
Rennie Stennett
Joe Stephenson
John Stephenson
Chris Stewart
Glen Stewart
Milt Stock
Steve Stone
Allyn Stout
Joe Strain
Sammy Strang
Chris Stratton
Darryl Strawberry
Hunter Strickland
Sailor Stroud
Bill Stuart
Drew Stubbs
Albert Suárez
Andrew Suarez
Guy Sularz
Mike Sullivan
Champ Summers
Tom Sunkel
Eric Surkamp
Max Surkont
Andrew Susac
Bill Swarback
Russ Swan
Mark Sweeney
Bill Swift
Ad Swigler
Thomas Szapucki

T

John Tamargo
Kensuke Tanaka
Jack Taschner
Stu Tate
Mike Tauchman
Don Taussig
Julián Tavárez
Bill Taylor
Bob Taylor
Dummy Taylor
Jack Taylor
Zack Taylor
Miguel Tejada
Rubén Tejada
Jim Tennant
Fred Tenney
Bill Terry
Wayne Terwilliger
Jeff Tesreau
Nick Testa
Ryan Theriot
Henry Thielman
Derrel Thomas
Fay Thomas
Herb Thomas
Valmy Thomas
Gary Thomasson
Fresco Thompson
Hank Thompson
Junior Thompson
Robby Thompson
Scot Thompson
Bobby Thomson
Jim Thorpe
Erick Threets
Mark Thurmond
Mike Tiernan
Rusty Tillman
Clay Timpner
Ledell Titcomb
Johnny Tobin
Ka'ai Tom
Andy Tomasic
Brett Tomko
Kelby Tomlinson
Tommy Toms
Fred Toney
Tony Torcato
Yorvit Torrealba
Andrés Torres
Salomón Torres
Red Tramback
Red Treadway
Alex Treviño
Andrew Triggs
Manny Trillo
Ken Trinkle
Chadwick Tromp
Nick Tropeano
Dasher Troy
Michael Tucker
Bob Tufts
Ty Tyson

U

Dan Uggla
George Uhle
George Ulrich
Juan Uribe
José Uribe

V

Mike Vail
Carlos Valderrama
Carlos Valdéz
Jose Valdez
Merkin Valdéz
Sergio Valdéz
George Van Haltren
William Van Landingham
Ike Van Zandt
Hy Vandenberg
John Vander Wal
Andrew Vasquez
Eugenio Vélez
Pat Veltman
Max Venable
Pat Venditte
Johnny Vergez
David Villar
Nick Vincent
Ozzie Virgil, Sr.
José Vizcaíno
Omar Vizquel
Ryan Vogelsong
Stephen Vogt
Bill Voiselle
Ed Vosberg
Jason Vosler

W

Ham Wade
LaMonte Wade Jr.
Heinie Wagner
Leon Wagner
Cole Waites
Dick Wakefield
Rube Walberg
Bill Walker
Curt Walker
Frank Walker
Kevin Walker
Tyler Walker
Joe Wall
Red Waller
Donovan Walton
Colin Ward
Monte Ward
John Warner
Bennie Warren
Libe Washburn
Mark Wasinger
George Watkins
Allen Watson
Mule Watson
Tony Watson
Roy Weatherly
Jim Weaver
Earl Webb
Logan Webb
Red Webb
Ben Weber
Jake Weimer
Phil Weintraub
Mickey Welch
Todd Wellemeyer
Brad Wellman
Jimmy Welsh
Lew Wendell
Billy Werber
Huyler Westervelt
Wes Westrum
Lew Whistler
Steve Whitaker
Bill White
Fuzz White
Burgess Whitehead
Eli Whiteside
Terry Whitfield
Art Whitney
Ed Whitson
Floyd Wicker
Stump Wiedman
Rob Wilfong
Hoyt Wilhelm
Joe Wilhoit
Rick Wilkins
Bernie Williams
Charlie Williams
Davey Williams
Frank Williams
Jackson Williams
Jerome Williams
Keith Williams
Luke Williams
Matt Williams
Mac Williamson
Jim Willoughby
Walt Wilmot
Art Wilson
Artie Wilson
Brian Wilson
Desi Wilson
George Wilson
Hack Wilson
Neil Wilson
Parke Wilson
Trevor Wilson
Hooks Wiltse
Randy Winn
Jesse Winters
Matt Wisler
Jack Wisner
Jay Witasick
Mickey Witek
Johnnie Wittig
Jim Wohlford
Alex Wood
Ted Wood
Mike Woodard
Pete Woodruff
Tim Worrell
Al Worthington
Jamey Wright
Roy Wright
Russ Wrightstone
Zeke Wrigley
Austin Wynns

X

Y

Keiichi Yabu
Mike Yastrzemski
George Yeager
Alex Young
Babe Young
Eric Young
Joel Youngblood
Ross Youngs
Sal Yvars

Z

Adrián Zabala
Elmer Zacher
Dom Zanni
Dave Zearfoss
Chad Zerbe
Heinie Zimmerman
Roy Zimmerman
Walter Zink
Barry Zito

External links
BR batting statistics
BR pitching statistics

 
 
Major League Baseball all-time rosters
Roster